Duvalioblemus sichuanicus is a species of beetle in the family Carabidae, the only species in the genus Duvalioblemus.

References

Trechinae